Czajkowski (feminine: Czajkowska, plural: Czajkowscy) is  a Polish noble family name for several coats of arms (see :pl:Czajkowscy ). The name derives from several locations names Czajki, Czajków, or Czajkowo, all derived from the name of the bird czajka, "lapwing".

See Tchaikovsky (surname) for various transcriptions into various languages.

People
 Adrian Czajkowski (born 1972), real name of British author Adrian Tchaikovsky
 Andrzej Czajkowski (1935–1982), Polish classical pianist and composer
  (1816–1873), Polish writer
 James Paul Czajkowski (born 1961), real name of American author James Rollins
 Jim Czajkowski (born 1963), American baseball player
 Józef Czajkowski (1872–1947), Polish artist and architect
 Krystyna Czajkowska (born 1936), Polish volleyball player
 Michał Czajkowski (1804–1886), Polish-Ukrainian writer
 Michelle Fus ( Michelle Czajkowski; born 1988), creator of webcomic Ava's Demon
  (born 1933), Polish geophysicist and writer
 Stanisław Czaykowski (1899–1933), Polish motor racing driver
  (1878–1954), Polish landscape painter
 Zbigniew Czajkowski (born 1921), Polish fencer
  (1926–1999), Polish participant in Warsaw Uprising
 Zofia Czajkowska (1905–1978), Polish musician and political prisoner

Fictional characters
 Magda Czajkowski, character on British serial drama Eastenders

References

See also
 
 Tchaikovsky (disambiguation)

Polish-language surnames
Polish toponymic surnames